Levi Hedge (April 19, 1766 – January 3, 1844) was an American educator.

Biography
Levi Hedge was born in Hardwick, Massachusetts. He graduated from Harvard University in 1792. His independent stand against hazing while still a student was instrumental in ridding Harvard of the injustice associated with its "hat law".  He was a Teacher at Westford Academy in Westford, MA from 1792 - 1794 (3)

He was appointed a tutor at Harvard in 1795. In 1801, he married Mary Kneeland, with whom he had eight children, including Frederic Henry Hedge, who became a clergyman, transcendentalist, scholar of German literature, and also a Harvard professor. He was elected a Fellow of the American Academy of Arts and Sciences in 1805. In 1810, Hedge became professor of logic and metaphysics.  He was elected a member of the American Antiquarian Society in 1816. He published Elements of Logick (Cambridge, 1816), which went through many editions, and was translated into German. In 1827 he moved to the Alford professorship of natural religion, moral philosophy, and civil polity. That year, also prepared an abridgment of Thomas Brown's Mental Philosophy (1827). An attack of paralysis compelled him to resign from Harvard in 1830. He died in Cambridge, Massachusetts in 1844.

Footnotes

References
 
 Thwing, C.F., "College Hazing", Scribners Monthly, Vol. 17, No.3, January 1879, pp. 331–334.
 Catalogue of Westford Academy  - 1890-91   page Past teachers (15)

1766 births
1844 deaths
Fellows of the American Academy of Arts and Sciences
Harvard University alumni
Harvard University faculty
Educators from Massachusetts
American philosophers
People from Hardwick, Massachusetts
People from Cambridge, Massachusetts
Members of the American Antiquarian Society